Theasinensin E is polyphenol flavonoid found in oolong tea. It's an atropisomer of theasinensin C.

References 

 
 

Flavanols
Polyphenols
Biphenyls